The Dusit Thani Dubai is a 40-floor hotel tower in Dubai, United Arab Emirates. The hotel has a total structural height of 153 m (502 ft) and 174 rooms.

History 
Construction began in 1998 and concluded in 2001. The arch of the hotel is 282 feet tall and meet on the 24th floor. It was built by architecture firm Khatib and Alami and has a modern style throughout the whole design.

See also 

 List of tallest buildings in Dubai
 List of tallest buildings in the United Arab Emirates
 List of tallest residential buildings in Dubai

References

External links 

 Official website

Skyscrapers in Dubai
Hotels in Dubai
Skyscraper hotels in Dubai
2001 establishments in the United Arab Emirates
Dusit International